Ex-Baháʼís or former Baháʼís are people who have been a member of the Baháʼí Faith at some time in their lives and later disassociated from it. The following is a list of notable ex-Baháʼís who have either converted to another religion or philosophy, or became non-religious. Baháʼís who are not in good standing, having lost their administrative rights for some transgression, are not considered ex-Baháʼís.

Converted to Christianity
John Ford Coley (born 1948) – American musician.
Francis Spataro – Became a follower of Charles Mason Remey. In the later years of his life, he became an Archbishop of the Apostolic Episcopal Church and left the Baháʼí Faith altogether.

Converted to Islam
Abd al-Hosayn Ayati (1871–1953) – Also known as Avarih. He spent 18 years as a Baháʼí travelling teacher and reverted to Shia Islam in 1921.
Sobhi Fazl'ollah Mohtadi (1897–1962) – Secretary of 'Abdu'l Bahá, who was expelled after opposing the leadership of Shoghi Effendi and later joined a Shia-Sufi Order.

Others

Denis MacEoin (1949–2022) – British academic, Baháʼí from about 1966 to 1980, he departed after disagreements with Baháʼís, mostly due to his research.
Alden Penner (born 1983) – Canadian musician, left in 2013 after personal differences with other Baháʼís.
Juan Cole (born 1952) – Having converted to the Baháʼí Faith in 1972, Juan Cole resigned in 1996 and became uninterested in organized religion.
Ahmad Kasravi (1890–1946) – Iranian lawyer and secular reformer, converted to the Baháʼí Faith and left it after a few years.

See also
List of Baháʼís
List of converts to the Baháʼí Faith
Covenant-breaker

Notes

References

Baha'is, former
Lists